Precision livestock farming (PLF) is a set of electronic tools and methods for managing livestock. It involves automated monitoring of animals to improve their production/reproduction, health, welfare, and impact on the environment. PLF tracks large animals, such as cows, "per animal"; however, it tracks smaller animals, such as poultry, "per flock", wherein the whole flock in a house is treated as one animal. Tracking "per flock" is widely used in broilers.

PLF technologies include cameras, microphones, and other sensors for tracking livestock, as well as accompanying computer software. The data recorded can be either quantitative or qualitative, and/or address sustainability.

Goals 

PLF involves the monitoring of animals, or the use of objective measurements on the animals, using signal analysis algorithms and statistical analysis. These techniques are applied in part with the goal of regaining an advantage of older, smaller-scale farming, namely detailed knowledge of individual animals. Before large farms became the norm, most farmers had an intimate knowledge of their livestock. Moreover, a farmer could typically trace an animal's pedigree and retain other important characteristics. Each animal was approached as an individual. In the past three decades, farms have multiplied in scale, with highly automated processes for feeding and other tasks. Consequently, farmers are forced to work with many more animals to make their living out of livestock farming and work with average values per group. Variety has become an impediment to increasing economies of scale.

Using information technology, farmers can record the attributes of each animal, such as pedigree, age, reproduction, growth, health, feed conversion, killing out percentage (carcass weight as a percentage of its live weight) and meat quality. Animal welfare, infection, aggression, weight, feed and water intake are variables that today can be monitored by PLF. Culling can be done on the basis of reproduction values, in addition to killing out percentage, meat quality, and health. The result of incorporating this technology into large-scale farming is a potentially significantly higher reproduction outcome, with each newborn also potentially contributing to a higher meat value.

In addition to these economic goals, precision livestock farming supports societal goals: food of high quality and general safety, animal farming that is efficient but also sustainable, animal health and well-being, and a small ecological footprint of livestock production.

Economic livestock farming 

Due to academic studies, the requirements of an animal are well known for each phase of its life and individual physical demands. These requirements allow the precise preparation of an optimal feed to support the animal. The requirements are oriented on the required nutrition – providing more nutrition than required make no economic sense, but providing less nutrients can be negative to the health of the animal.

Quality and safety 

Economic goals are an important factor in livestock farming, but not the only one. Legal bodies (such as the government and industrial bodies) set quality standards that are legally binding to any livestock producing company. In addition, societal standards are followed.

'Quality' in this context includes:

 the quality of used ingredients
 the quality of animal keeping
 the quality of the processes

One example for issues with quality of ingredients is the (nowadays often illegal) use of meat and bone meal for ruminant animals.

Ecological livestock farming 

Selecting the "right" ingredients can have a positive effect on the environment pollution. It has been shown that optimizing the feed this can reduce nitrogen and phosphorus found in the excrements of pigs.

Tools 

PLF starts with consistently collecting information about each animal. For this, there are several technologies: unique ID, electronic wearables to identify illness and other issues, software, cameras, etc.

Each animal requires a unique number (typically by means of an ear tag). This can be utilized through a visual ID, passive electronic ID tag or an active electronic ID tag. For example, at birth, the farmer selects "Birth" from the menu on the reader, after which the interactive screen requests the user to read the tag of the mother. Next, tags are inserted in the ears of newborns and read. With this simple action, important information is recorded, such as:
Which animal is the mother,
How many animals were delivered,
What the sex of the animals is,
A date of birth.

Electronic wearable devices such as an active smart ear tag can get data from individual animals such as temperature and activity patterns.  This data can be utilized in identification of illness, heat stress, oestrous, etc.  This enables individualized care for the animals and methods to lower stress upon them.  The end result is judicious use of drug treatments and nutrition to bolster healthy growth. This provides livestock producers with the tools to identify sick animals sooner and more accurately. This early detection leads to reduction in costs by lowering re-treatment rate and death loss, and getting animals back to peak performance faster.

Data recorded by the farmer or collected by sensors is then gathered by software. Although there has been software used that was run on a single computer, it has become more common for the software to connect to the internet, so that much of the data processing can happen on a remote server. Having the software connected to the internet can also make it easier to look up information about a particular animal. Due to high computational requirements, PLF requires computer-supported tools. The following types (available for PCs and via Internet) are available: 
 Induction/processing software applications (a necessity for use with electronic active ID tags)
 Automated livestock administration software
 Reproduction optimization software
 Feed formulation software
 Quality management software

Examples in different industries

Dairy Industry

Robotic Milkers 

In automatic milking, a robotic milker can be used for precision management of dairy cattle. The main advantages are time savings, greater production, a record of valuable information, and diversion of abnormal milk. Brands of robotic milkers include Lely and DeLavel.

Automatic Feeders 
An automatic feeder is a tool used to provide feed to cattle. It is composed of a robot (either on a rail system or self-propelled) that will feed the cattle at designated times. The robot mixes the feed ration and will deliver a programmed amount.

Activity Collars 
Activity collars gather biometric data from animals. Some wearable devices help farmers with estrous detection, as well as other adverse health events or conditions.

Inline Milk Sensors 
Inline milk sensors help farmers identify variation of components in the milk. Some sensors are relatively simple technologies that measure properties such as electrical conductivity, and others use automated sampling and reagents to provide a different measure to inform management decisions.

Meat Industry

EID / RFID / Electronic Identification / Electronic Ear Tags 
Radio Frequency IDentification (commonly known as RFID or EID) is applied in cattle, pigs, sheep, goats, deer and other types of livestock for individual identification. There is currently a growing trend of RFID or EID becoming mandatory for certain species. For example, Australia has made EID compulsory for cattle, as has New Zealand for deer, and the EU for sheep and goats. EID makes identification of individual animals much less error-prone. RFID enhances traceability, but it also provides other benefits such as reproduction tracking (pedigree, progeny, and productivity), automatic weighing, and drafting.

Smart Ear Tags 
Cattle hide their symptoms of illness from humans due to their predatory response. Smart cattle ear tags constantly gather behavioural and biometric data from cattle, allowing managers to see the exact animals that need more attention regarding their health. Smart ear tagging has been shown to be effective in identifying illness earlier and more accurately than traditional visual monitoring.

Swine Industry 
There are many tools available to closely monitor animals in the swine industry. Size is an important factor in swine production.

Automated Weight Detection Cameras 
Automated weight detection cameras can be used to calculate the pig's weight without a scale. These cameras can have an accuracy of less than 1.5 kilograms.

Microphones to Detect Respiratory Problems 
In the swine industry, the presence of respiratory problems must be closely monitored. There are multiple pathogens that can cause infection, however, enzootic pneumonia is one of the most common respiratory diseases in pigs caused by Mycoplasma hyopneumoniae and other bacteria. This is an airborne disease that can be easily spread due to the proximity of the pigs in the herd. Early detection is important in using fewer antibiotics and minimising economic loss due to appetite loss of pigs. A common symptom of this is chronic coughing.  A microphone can be used to detect the sound of coughing in the herd and raise an alert to the farmer.

Climate Control 
Thermal stress is connected to reduced performance, illness, and mortality. Depending on geographical location, and the types of animals will require different heating or ventilation systems. Broilers, laying hens, and piglets like to be kept warm. Sensors can be used to constantly receive data about the climate control in the livestock houses and the automatic feeding systems. The behaviour of animals can also be monitored.

Poultry Industry 
In the poultry industry, unfavourable climate conditions increase the chances of behavioural, respiratory, and digestive disorders in the birds. Thermometers should be used to ensure proper temperatures, and animals should be closely monitored for signs of unsatisfactory climate.

Quantitative Methods, towards scientifically based management of livestock farming 

The development of quantitative methods for livestock production includes mathematical modelling based in plant-herbivore or predator-prey models to forecast and optimise meet production. An example is the Predator-Prey Grassland Livestock Model (PPGL) to address the dynamics of the combined grass-animals system as a predator-prey dynamical system. This PPGL model has been used to simulate the effect of forage deficiency on the farm's economic performance.

References 

Livestock
Sustainable agriculture
Agriculture-related lists